The discography of South Korean girl group After School consists of three studio albums, eight single albums, thirteen singles, five soundtrack contributions, twenty three videos and eight promotional singles. 

After School debuted in 2009 with the release of their single "Ah" and the single album New Schoolgirl. In April 2009, following the addition of new member Uee, the group released the digital single "Diva", which won the Cyworld Digital Music Award for Rookie of the Month. Seven months later, following the departure of Soyoung and the additions of Raina and Nana, the group released their second single album, Because of You, with the digital single "Diva" being included as a b-side. "Because of You" became the group's first and only number 1 single on the Gaon Digital Chart. The song was the best selling single of December 2009 in South Korea. "Because of You" was then remixed and promoted briefly in the beginning of 2010. After School then promoted the b-side "When I Fall" from the Because of You album in February 2010, before concluding promotions for the single album.

The group's third single album, Bang!, was released on March 25, 2010, with both the title track and the single album peaking at number 2 on the Gaon Music Chart. The single sold over 2 million copies during 2010. Following a short hiatus, the group released their first charity single Happy Pledis 1st Album in December 2010. The album's lead single, "Love Love Love" peaked at number 8 on the Gaon Digital Chart, with the album peaking at number 2.

In 2011, After School began their venture into the Japanese music market. The group, minus Bekah, collaborated with Namie Amuro for her collaboration album Checkmate!. The song charted at number 73 on the Billboard Japan Hot 100 and at number 10 on the RIAJ Digital Track Chart. Shortly after, the group released their first studio album in Korea titled Virgin. The lead single, "Shampoo", charted at number 4 on the Gaon Digital Chart whilst its parent album charted at number 2 on the Gaon Album Chart. Following promotions for their first Korean studio album, the group released their fourth single album "Red" / "Blue", which saw the group split into two subunits "After School Red" and "After School Blue". After School Red's lead single "In the Night Sky" charted at number 9 on the Gaon Digital Chart whilst After School Blue's lead single, "Wonder Boy", charted at number 15. The following month, the group released their debut single in Japan, which was a Japanese remake of their Korean single "Bang!". The song peaked at number 7 on the Oricon Singles Chart. The group's second Japanese single, a remake of "Diva", was released in November of that year and charted at number 12 on the Oricon Singles Chart. The group rounded off the year by participating in Pledis Entertainment's second charity single, Happy Pledis 2nd Album, along with label-mates Son Dam-bi and NU'EST, who were then referred to as Pledis Boyz.

After School's first double A-side single, "Rambling Girls/Because of You", was released in Japan at the beginning of 2012. Following the release of these singles, the group's debut studio album in Japan, Playgirlz (2012) was released, peaking at number 8 on the Oricon Albums Chart. The group then released their second double A-side single in Japan in June 2012, "Lady Luck/Dilly Dally", and it became their highest charting single in Japan, peaking at number 6. A week later, following leader Kahi's departure, the group returned to South Korea for the release of their fifth single album "Flashback". The album peaked at number 3 whilst the single peaked at number 14 on the Gaon Digital Chart.

The group's first greatest hits album was released in March 2013, along with a DVD of their first Japanese tour. After School's final Korean single before the departure of most of its members, "First Love", was released in June 2013. This was followed by a return to the Japanese music market with the releases of "Heaven" (2013) and "Shh" (2014) followed by their second Japanese studio album, and third overall, Dress to Kill (2014). The group then released their second greatest hits album in Japan, Best (2015). The greatest hits album was the final release promoted by the group before a hiatus.

Albums

Studio albums

Compilation albums

Single albums

Singles

As lead artist

As featured artist

Promotional singles

Soundtrack appearances

Other charted songs

Other appearances

Video albums

DVDs

Music videos

Notes

References

Discography
Discographies of South Korean artists
K-pop music group discographies